Auto-lead Data Format (ADF) is an open XML-based standard specifically for communicating consumer purchase requests to automotive dealerships. Thirteen leading automotive-related Internet companies developed the ADF standard, and now many vendors of Customer Retention Management systems serving the automotive industry support ADF.

Example XML File
The example found in the Official ADF Specifications (PDF) does not pass XML validation and files based on this example may be rejected by ADF lead software. Below is an example that passes XML validation and has been accepted and parsed by ADF lead software:

<?xml version="1.0" encoding="UTF-8"?>
<?adf version="1.0"?>
<adf>
    <prospect>
        <requestdate>2000-03-30T15:30:20-08:0</requestdate>
        <vehicle>
            <year>2008</year>
            <make>Make</make>
            <model>Model</model>
        </vehicle>
        <customer>
            <contact>
                <name part="first">First</name>
                <name part="last">Last</name>
                <phone>323-223-3322</phone>
                <email>emailaddress</email>
            </contact>
        </customer>
        <vendor>
            <contact>
                <name part="full">Dealer Name</name>
            </contact>
        </vendor>
    </prospect>
</adf>

Mime Type

As this is not an IETF standard, the recommended mime type to use is application/x-adf+xml

See also
 List of XML markup languages

External links
 Auto Lead Data Format rules and guides
 How Forms Drive the Automotive Industry
 Mudd Advertising ADF Generator
Programming languages
XML-based standards